Bengt Daniel Ankarloo, formerly Norrman, 19 mars 1970 born in Backa, Gothenburg, is a Swedish Ph.D. in economic history, author and senior lecturer at Malmö University.

Research 
Ankarloo has among other endeavors critiqued the claimed scientific status of discipline of economics. And dealt with Marxist critique of political economy. He has also written works regarding the introduction of New public management to education.

Public figure 
Ankarloo has been a reoccurring figure involved in the debate regarding the public debate regarding the welfare state in Sweden, something he has also lectured about at Malmö University. He has shown that 75 percent of the swedes support at publicly funded welfare state. And has argued that the claimed problems regarding supporting the welfare state are simply false.

Bibliography

Books and dissertations 

 Institutions", what is in a word? : a critique of the new institutional economics, 2000.
 Kris i välfärdsfrågan : vänstern, välfärden och socialismen,2005
 Marknadsmyter : en kritisk betraktelse av nyliberala påståenden, 2008
 Den högre utbildningen: ett fält av marknad och politik,2012

Articles 

 New Institutional Economics and economic history
 After golden age: The Labor movement and end of Fordism

References

External links 
 Dokument inifrån - Politiker utan mål - Documentary regarding politicians without goals, featuring Ankarloo

Academic staff of Malmö University
21st-century Swedish historians
Critics of political economy
1970 births
Living people
People from Gothenburg Municipality